Syria's estimated pre–Syrian Civil War 2011 population was 22 ±.5 million permanent inhabitants, which included 21,124,000 Syrians, as well as 1.3 million Iraqi refugees and over 500,000 Palestinians refugees.<ref name="World Refugee Survey 2008" /refugees. The war makes an accurate count of the Syrian population difficult, as the numbers of Syrian refugees, internally displaced Syrians and casualty numbers are in flux. The CIA World Factbook showed an estimated 20.4m people as of July 2021. Of the pre-war population, six million are refugees outside the country, seven million are internally displaced, three million live in rebel-held territory, and two million live in the Kurdish-ruled Autonomous Administration of North and East Syria.

Most modern-day Syrians are described as Arabs by virtue of their modern-day language and bonds to Arab culture and history. Genetically, Syrian Arabs are a variety of diverse Semitic-speaking groups indigenous to the region. With around 10% of the population, Kurds are the second biggest ethnic group in Syria, followed by Turkmen.

Human toll of Syrian Civil War

Forced displacement 

More than six million refugees left the country during the civil war, of whom over five million are registered as refugees by the UNHCR as of mid-2019. Most of them fled to neighboring countries such as Turkey, Lebanon, Jordan, and Iraq, as well as European nations like Greece, Germany and Sweden. Since 2017, around 49 percent of the Population lives in poverty.

The war resulted in large-scale displacement in the country. The UNHCR estimates internally displaced people (IDPs) at seven million. A further 70,000 people were trapped on the border with Jordan at Rukban in 2016–18, with up to 40,000 still there in 2019.

A significant part of the population lives in territory outside government sovereignty. At its peak in 2015, ISIL ruled over ten million people across Syria and Iraq. The Autonomous Administration of North and East Syria (NES), commonly referred to as Rojava, has a population of around two million. Areas controlled by the opposition have had a population in the millions. In mid-2017, UN OCHA estimated that around 540,000 persons were trapped in besieged areas as of June 2017, the majority besieged by government forces in Eastern Ghouta. By the time the government retook Ghouta in April 2018, some 140,000 individuals had fled their homes and up to 50,000 were evacuated to Idlib and Aleppo governorates. The latter rebel areas had an estimated population of 3 million (40% of them displaced from defeated rebel areas). Fighting in Idlib has led to further displacements, of up to 250,000 people, and generating new refugee outflows to neighbouring Turkey.

Displacement has led to demographic shifts. One example is the area in the North under control by Kurdish-led and US-backed Syrian Democratic Forces (SDF). Many human rights groups, including Amnesty International and international organizations have accused SDF forces of committing ethnic cleansing in Arab areas they were capturing from other war factions. The accusation was repeated on 8 May 2019 by Russia's foreign minister Sergey Lavrov. NGOs and the opposition have also accused the government of using the conflict to affect demographic restructuring.

Birth-death rate 

In April 2016, the UN estimated that 400,000 people had died in the war, and casualties have continued since, with estimates for the total dead by mid-2019 of up to 220,000 civilians, 175,000 government combatants, and 174,000 anti-government combatants  (see Casualties of the Syrian Civil War).

Population 

Since 1960, censuses have been conducted in 1960, 1970, 1981, 1994 and 2004.

In 2014, 17,951,639, a massive decline due to nearly 4 million Syrian refugees leaving the country because of the Syrian Civil War and furthermore because of the death in the war. This is a drop of 9.7% from the previous year.

In 2017, the head of the Syrian Commission for Family Affairs, Mohammad Akram al-Qash, said that the Syrian population was 28 million, of which, 21 million were living in Syria and that 7 million were refugees.

In 2018, 19,454,263 estimated.

Age structure

Median age 
This data is from CIA World Factbook:

total: 24.5 yearsmale: 24 yearsfemale: 25 years (2018 est.)

Population decline rate
This data is from CIA World Factbook:

0.797% (2012 est.)

Birth rate
This data is from CIA World Factbook:

20.7 births/1,000 population (2018 est.)

Death rate
This data is from CIA World Factbook:

4 deaths/1,000 population (2018 est.)

Net migration rate
This data is from CIA World Factbook:

57 migrant(s)/1,000 population (2018 est.)

Sex ratio
This data is from CIA World Factbook:

at birth: 1.06 male(s)/female0–14 years: 1.05 male(s)/female
15–24 years: 1.03 male(s)/female
25–54 years: 0.99 male(s)/female
55–64 years: 0.98 male(s)/female
65 years and over: 0.82 male(s)/femaletotal population: 1.01 male(s)/female (2017 est.)

Demographic statistics 
UN estimates:

Life expectancy at birth

This data is from CIA World Factbook:

total: 75.2 years
male: 72.8 years
female: 77.8 years (2018 est.)

Population centers 

60% of the population lives in the Aleppo Governorate, the Euphrates valley or along the coastal plain; a fertile strip between the coastal mountains and the desert.

Urbanization 
This data is from CIA World Factbook:

Urban population: 54.2% of total population (2018)

Rate of urbanization: 1.43% annual rate of change (2015-20 est.)

Major urban areas 

As of 2018; this data is from CIA World Factbook:

Damascus (capital): 2.32 million

Aleppo: 1.754 million

Homs: 1.295 million

Hama: 894,000

Race and ethnicity 
On 1 January 2011, Syria was estimated to have a population of 24 million people, distributed over its 14 governorates. Arabs represent 80-85% of the population, with the rest being a mixture of many ethnic and religious sects, as shown in the table below:

The CIA World Factbook cites the following figures for ethnic groups as at July 2018: approximately Arab 50%, Alawite 15%, Kurd 10%, Levantine 10%, other 15% (includes Druze, Ismaili, Imami, Nusairi, Assyrians, Turkmen, Armenian and Chechens). However, Professor John A. Shoup said in 2018 that Kurds made 9% of the population, followed by Turkish-speaking Turkmen comprising 4-5% , Assyrians 4%, Armenians 2%, and Circassians about 1% of the total population.

There has been no Syrian census including a question about religion since 1960, these are thus the last official statistics available:

In 1991 Professor Alasdair Drysdale and Professor Raymond Hinnebusch said that some 85% of Syrians were Muslims and that the remainder were almost all Christians, however, both religious groups were subdivided into many ethnic sects. Among the former, approximately 75% of Syrians were Sunni Muslim, of whom, 60% were Arabic-speaking and the remainder of Sunnis included Kurds 8.5%, Turkmen/Turkoman 3%, and Circassians (less than 1%). In addition, Alawis formed 5.5%, Druze 3% and Ismailis 1.5% of the population. In regards to the Christians, they were subdivided into the Greek Orthodox 4.7%, Armenians 4% and Assyrians 1%.

According to Pierre Beckouche, before 2011, Sunni Muslims accounted for 78% of Syria's population, which included 500,000 Palestinian refugees and the non-Arab Sunni Muslims, namely the Kurds 9-10% and the Turkmen/Turkoman 4%. Other Muslims included Shias and Alawites 11%-16%, whilst the Christians made up 6% of the population. There were also a few Jewish communities in Aleppo and Damascus.

The CIA World Factbook cites the following figures for religious groups: 
religions - Muslim 87% (official; includes Sunni 74% and Alawi, Ismaili, and Shia 13%), Christian 10% (mainly of the Greek Orthodox and Greek Catholic churches - may be smaller as a result of Christians fleeing the country), Druze 3%.

A general census of Syria in 1943 gave details of religious groups of the population and the rate of growth of each and estimates of the population in 1953 from an unnamed source were as follows:

Literacy rate 
Education is free and compulsory from ages 6 to 11. Schooling consists of 6 years of primary education followed by a 3-year general or vocational training period and a 3-year academic or vocational program. The second 3-year period of academic training is required for university admission. Total enrollment at post-secondary schools is over 150,000. The literacy rate of Syrians aged 15 and older is 86.0% for males and 73.6% for females.

Languages

Arabic is the official, and most widely spoken, language. Arabic speakers make up 85% of the population. Several modern Arabic dialects are used in everyday life, most notably Levantine in the west and Mesopotamian in the northeast. A report published by the UNHCR points out that "while the majority of Syrians are considered Arabs, this is a term based on spoken language (Arabic), not ethnicity."

According to The Encyclopedia of Arabic Language and Linguistics, in addition to Arabic, the following languages are spoken in the country, in order of the number of speakers: Kurdish, Turkish, Neo-Aramaic (four dialects), Circassian, Chechen, Armenian, and finally Greek. None of these languages have official status.

Many educated Syrians also speak English and French.

References

External links
 Syrian Arab Republic: 2004 Census Data, Humanitarian Response, United Nations Office for the Coordination of Humanitarian Affairs

 

pt:Síria#Demografia